The Double Man may refer to:
 The Double Man (book), a 1941 book of poems by W. H. Auden
 The Double Man (1967 film), a British spy film
 The Double Man (1976 film), a Danish crime film